The 14th ceremony of the Screen Actors Guild Awards, honoring the best in film and television acting achievement for the year 2007, took place on January 27, 2008 and, for the 12th consecutive time was held at the Shrine Exposition Center in Los Angeles, California. It was broadcast live simultaneously by TNT and TBS.

The nominees were announced on December 20, 2007 by Jeanne Tripplehorn and Terrence Howard at Los Angeles' Pacific Design Center's Silver Screen Theater.

Into the Wild received the highest number of nominations among the film categories with four, three for acting and one for ensemble performance. In the television categories The Sopranos, 30 Rock and Ugly Betty had the most nominations with three each.

The 2007 Screen Actors Guild Awards was the first to give awards for Outstanding Performance by a Stunt Ensemble in a Motion Picture and Outstanding Performance by a Stunt Ensemble in a Television Series.

The 2007 ceremony celebrated the 75th anniversary of the Screen Actors Guild with historical background and film clips presented in segments introduced by Blair Underwood throughout the ceremony. Charles Durning was presented with an award for Lifetime Achievement following accolades by Denis Leary and Burt Reynolds.

The ceremony was held in the midst of the ongoing Writers Guild of America strike. Because the acting community steadfastly had supported the writers during this period, the WGA granted a waiver on December 11, 2007, to SAG for the awards show, allowing members to attend without having to cross picket lines. While talk of the strike was kept to a minimum, Julie Christie openly acknowledged it in her acceptance speech, commenting, "It's lovely to receive an award from your own union, especially at a time when we're being so forcefully reminded how important unions are." In her acceptance speech, Tina Fey thanked the Screen Actors Guild for its support of the WGA.

After acknowledging the recent death of Heath Ledger, Daniel Day-Lewis dedicated his award to the actor.

Winners and nominees
Winners are listed first and highlighted in boldface.

Screen Actors Guild Life Achievement Award 
The Screen Actors Guild Life Achievement Award was presented to:
 Charles Durning

Film

Television

In Memoriam 
Denis Leary introduced a previously recorded "In Memoriam" segment which honored the life and career of the great actors who died last year:

Merv Griffin
Charles Nelson Reilly
Barbara McNair
Brad Renfro
Janet Blair
Allan Melvin
Lois Nettleton
Tige Andrews
Miyoshi Umeki
George Grizzard
Percy Rodriguez
Ron Carey
Charles Lane
Joey Bishop
Roscoe Lee Browne
Floyd "Red Crow" Westerman
Johnny Grant
Alice Ghostley
Kitty Carlisle
James T. Callahan
Robert Goulet
Laraine Day
Michael Kidd
Marcel Marceau
Alice Backes
Lee Bergere
Gretchen Wyler
Ian Richardson
Dick Wilson
Barry Nelson
Beverly Sills
Dabbs Greer
Suzanne Pleshette
Tom Poston
Jack Williams
Luciano Pavarotti
Jane Wyman
Betty Hutton
Deborah Kerr
Heath Ledger

References

2007
2007 film awards
2007 television awards
2007 guild awards
Screen
Screen Actors Guild
Screen
January 2008 events in the United States